WECO may refer to:

 Western Electric Company
 Winnipeg Electric Company
 WECO (AM), a radio station (940 AM) licensed to Wartburg, Tennessee, United States
 WECO-FM, a radio station (101.3 FM) licensed to Wartburg, Tennessee, United States
 WECO Lab
 WECO Pyrotechnische Fabrik, a German fireworks company
 Wisconsin Engraving Company, a tooling industry services provider.